A post office may have operated in New York City as early as 1687. The United States Postal Service has no information on New York's postmasters prior to the year 1775. The New York City Post Office is first mentioned in Hugh Finlay's journal dated 1773 which lists Alexander Colden as the postmaster of New York City. Other sources indicate that Colden may have served as postmaster as early as 1753. Postmasters are appointed by the President of the United States.

References